Medicosma fareana, commonly known as white aspen, is a species of rainforest small tree in the family Rutaceae and is endemic to north Queensland. It has elliptical leaves and white or cream-coloured flowers borne singly or in small groups in leaf axils.

Description

Taxonomy
White aspen was first formally described in 1875 by Ferdinand von Mueller, who gave it the name Euodia fareana and published the description in the Fragmenta phytographiae Australiae from specimens collected near Rockingham Bay by John Dallachy. In 1985 Thomas Gordon Hartley changed the name to Medicosma fareana.

Distribution and habitat
Medicosma fareana grows in rainforest from near Cooktown to Mount Fox in north Queensland.

Conservation status
This species is classified as of "least concern" under the Queensland Government Nature Conservation Act 1992.

References

fareana
Sapindales of Australia
Flora of Queensland
Plants described in 1875
Taxa named by Ferdinand von Mueller